John Holmes Goodenow (25 September 1833 – 29 July 1906) was an American politician from Maine. Goodenow, a resident of Alfred, Maine, served one term in the Maine House of Representatives (1859) and two terms in the Maine Senate (1861-1862). During both terms in the Maine Senate, Goodenow was elected Senate President. His father, Daniel Goodenow was a Whig politician and two-time Maine Attorney General and Associate Justice of the Maine Supreme Judicial Court.

John Holmes Goodenow eventually became consul-general to the Ottoman Empire in Constantinopole when he was appointed by President Abraham Lincoln. He replaced fellow Maine State Senator Charles Goddard.

Goodenow was a lawyer and graduate of Bowdoin College.

References

1833 births
1906 deaths
People from Alfred, Maine
Members of the Maine House of Representatives
Presidents of the Maine Senate
Bowdoin College alumni
19th-century American politicians